USS Kitkun Bay (CVE-71) was the seventeenth of fifty  built for the United States Navy during World War II. She was launched in November 1943, and transferred to the Navy and commissioned in December. She served in the Mariana and Palau Islands campaign, the Battle off Samar, in which she was the first ship to undergo kamikaze attack, and the Invasion of Lingayen Gulf, during which she was damaged by another kamikaze and forced to withdraw. Post-war, she participated in Operation Magic Carpet, repatriating U.S. servicemen from around the Pacific. She was decommissioned in April 1946, and sold for scrapping in November. Ultimately, she was broken up in early 1947.

Design and description

Kitkun Bay was a Casablanca-class escort carrier, the most numerous type of aircraft carriers ever built, and designed specifically to be mass-produced using prefabricated sections, in order to replace heavy early war losses. She displaced  standard,  with a full load. She was powered with two Skinner Unaflow reciprocating steam engines, which drove two shafts, providing , thus enabling her to make . Her compact size necessitated the installment of an aircraft catapult at her bow, and there were two aircraft elevators to facilitate movement of aircraft between the flight and hangar deck: one each fore and aft.

One /38 caliber dual-purpose gun was mounted on the stern. Anti-aircraft defense was provided by eight Bofors  anti-aircraft guns in single mounts, as well as twelve Oerlikon  cannons, which were mounted around the perimeter of the deck. By the end of the war, Casablanca-class carriers had been modified to carry thirty  cannons, and the amount of Bofors  guns had been doubled to sixteen, by putting them into twin mounts. These modifications were in response to increasing casualties due to kamikaze attacks. Casablanca-class carriers were designed for a complement of 890, along with 50 to 56 airmen in the attached squadron. Casablanca-class escort carriers were designed to carry 27 aircraft, but the hangar deck could accommodate more. During the Mariana and Palau Islands campaign, she carried 12 FM-2 fighters, and 8 TBM-1C torpedo bombers, for a total of 20 aircraft. However, during the Philippines campaign and Battle off Samar, she carried 16 FM-2 fighters and 12 TBM-1C torpedo bombers for a total of 28 aircraft. During the Invasion of Lingayen Gulf, she carried 15 FM-2 fighters, 10 TBM-3 torpedo bombers, along with two reconnaissance planes, an FM-2P and a TBM-3P.

Construction
Her construction was awarded to Kaiser Shipbuilding Company, Vancouver, Washington, under a Maritime Commission contract, Mc Hull 1108, on 18 June 1942. She was laid down on 3 May 1943 under the name Kitkun Bay, under Frank Knox's directive naming escort carriers for "sounds, bays, and islands". Her namesake, Kitkun Bay, is located on the southeastern end of Prince of Wales Island, constituting part of the Alexander Archipelago, at the time within the Territory of Alaska. She was laid down as MC hull 1108, the seventeenth of a series of fifty Casablanca-class escort carriers. She was launched on 8 November 1943; sponsored by Mrs. Francis E. Cruise; transferred to the Navy and commissioned at Astoria, Oregon on 15 December 1943, with Captain John Perry Whitney in command.

Service history
Upon being commissioned, Kitkun Bay spent the rest of December and early January undergoing outfitting at U.S. Naval Ship Yard Tongue Point, Astoria, Oregon. She then underwent a shakedown cruise down the West Coast, heading to Naval Air Station North Island, San Diego, California. She arrived at San Diego on 22 January 1944, and after spending a week conducting exercises off the Channel Islands, she loaded Marine Torpedo Bomber Squadron (VMTB) 242 on a transport mission bound for the New Hebrides.

Kitkun Bay arrived at Espiritu Santo on 14 February, where she took on a load of cargo, ferrying it to Efate, arriving on 18 February. On her return trip, she stopped at Pearl Harbor on 28 February, arriving back at part in San Diego on 6 March. From 9 to 17 March, she conducted pilot qualifications with her intended air contingent, Composite Squadron (VC) 5 until she returned to port, during which VC-5 was detached for further training. For the rest of March, she performed pilot qualifications for a variety of different squadrons. During April, she was moored at Naval Base San Diego, where maintenance and repairs were conducted. During this period, Rear Admiral Harold Bushnell Salada, commander of Carrier Division 26, designated Kitkun Bay as his flagship. On 1 May, she left port with VC-5 attached.

Mariana and Palau Islands campaign

On 31 May, Kitkun Bay sallied forth as part of an armada escorting Transport Division 16 towards Saipan of the Mariana Islands for the planned landings there. Kitkun Bay, along with the other carriers, launched fighter and antisubmarine patrols. On 8 June, she arrived at Kwajalein Atoll. There, she was assigned to serve as the flagship of Task Unit 52.11.1. On 13 June, her fighters notched their first kill, shooting down a Mitsubishi G4M1 variant bomber at 11:05. She arrived off Saipan on 14 June, and her aircraft contingent commenced close air support on the following day.

On the afternoon of 18 June, a large formation of Japanese aircraft, estimated at around thirty to fifty planes, was detected approaching from the south. At 17:55, six planes broke through the air screen, and approached the escort carriers. One of these planes, identified as a Nakajima J1N, made a run on Kitkun Bay from her starboard bow. The aircraft was engaged by anti-aircraft fire, but still managed to release its torpedo within  of the carrier. As the plane attempted to pull out, it was further damaged, before nose-diving into the ocean. The next day, on 19 June, Kitkun Bays aircraft participated in the Battle of the Philippine Sea, providing a screen and intercepting Japanese planes.

From 5 to 10 July, Kitkun Bay replenished at Eniwetok of the Marshall Islands. On 23 July, the escort carriers turned their attention towards Tinian, with Kitkun Bay sending sixteen FM-2 Wildcats and eleven TBM-1C Avengers to strike targets around the island. On 1 August, the escort carriers transitioned towards supporting the landings on Guam. As the marines secured the island, the escort carriers retired for Eniwetok, arriving on 7 August. On 8 August, Rear Admiral Ralph A. Ofstie took over command of Carrier Division 26, and broke his flag on Kitkun Bay. On 8 September, she escorted the landing craft participating in the landings on Peleliu and Angaur of the Palau Islands, providing close air support as they landed on 15 September. On 21 September, the escort carriers withdrew to Ulithi of the Caroline Islands. They then proceeded to Seeadler Harbor on Manus Island of the Admiralty Islands, where they prepared for the planned Philippines campaign. Kitkun Bay left Seeadler Harbor on 12 October as part of an advance contingent, escorting Rear Admiral William Fechteler's Task Group 28.2. She arrived off of Mindanao on 19 October, and commenced operations in support of the landings on Leyte starting on 20 October.

Philippines campaign

Battle off Samar

Rear Admiral Ofstie had responsibility over Kiktun Bay and Gambier Bay, but Sprague had authority over the unit as a whole. As the U.S. fleet gathered off the Philippines, the Japanese garrison on Suluan managed to alert their command. This prompted Admiral Soemu Toyoda to launch Shō-Gō 1, a gambit to defend Japan's access to the oil fields of Southeast Asia. On 18 and 19 October, Taffy 3 conducted strikes against Japanese bases located within Cebu, Negros, and Panay, destroying a total of thirty-eight planes, and damaging twenty-eight more. She then steamed off the island of Samar from 20 to 25 October, providing air support for U.S. forces onshore, and dropping leaflets on Japanese positions. In the meantime, Admiral William Halsey Jr. led his Third Fleet northwards, after spotting Vice Admiral Jisaburō Ozawa's diversionary Northern Force. Thus, the only ships covering the vulnerable landing crafts of Leyte Gulf were the three escort carrier task groups and their screens. Taffy 3, the northmost task group, would bear the brunt of Vice Admiral Takeo Kurita's Center Force as it swung through the San Bernardino Strait.  
 
On the early morning of 25 October, Kurita's Center Force had already crossed the San Bernardino Strait unmolested, and was entering the open waters of Leyte Gulf. White Plainss radar had possibly spotted the Japanese force maneuvering into position at 3:00, but this information was disregarded by the ship's command. Although World War II era surface radar was notoriously faulty, the speed and course of the spotted blip was consistent with the course set by the Center Force.

At 4:30, the escort carriers went to general quarters in preparation for another round of airstrikes and close air support. The first indication of Japanese contact happened shortly after 6:30, when Taffy 3 experienced three almost simultaneous warnings. Firstly, they began receiving unencrypted Japanese chatter. In fact, a TBM Avenger from St. Lo had stumbled into the midst of the Japanese fleet, and began radioing Rear Admiral Sprague warnings. As such, the opening stages of the Battle off Samar caught Sprague and the escort carriers completely by surprise.

Upon coming to an understanding of the severity of the situation, Sprague ordered Taffy 3 to steam eastward, in hopes of being shielded by a passing rain squall. Kitkun Bay swung to 70°, into the wind to aid in launching planes. At 6:55, Kitkun Bay went to flight quarters, "on the double", launching a set of eight FM-2 Wildcats from 6:56 to 7:03. At 7:10, Kitkun Bay sent out six TBM-1C Avengers, each armed with four  semi-armor piercing bombs. At 7:11, another FM-2 Wildcat was dispatched. Sprague also radioed for assistance from Vice Admiral Jesse B. Oldendorf, the commander of Task Group 77.2, which had just defeated the Southern Force in the Battle of Surigao Strait. Unfortunately for Sprague, Oldendorf was at least three hours sail away, Task Group 77.2 was scattered over an immense distance because of the previous night's battle, and it was low on both fuel and ammunition. Taffy 3 would have to confront the Center Force by itself.

The Japanese were firing dye-marked shells to gauge their aim, and  Fanshaw Bay and White Plains were quickly bracketed between plumes of color, much to the concern of their command onboard. The officers would certainly be more concerned if they were able to correspond the color of the dyed water to that of a particular Japanese ship, as the pink dyes corresponded to the Japanese battleship , with its  guns, the largest ever manufactured, and the yellow dyes corresponded to the Japanese battleship , with its  guns.

As the Japanese fleet approached closer, Kitkun Bay began to jettison some of her armaments at hand, while continuing to frantically emit smoke. At 7:35, Sprague ordered the escort carriers to begin engaging with their 5-inch guns, and by the end of the battle, Kitkun Bay had expended 120 of the 180 rounds available. At 7:59, one of her shells impacted what was possibly a cruiser, starting a fire in the fore. At 8:03, Kitkun Bay launched a further three FM-2 Wildcats, to join the eight launched earlier. In the meantime, the pilots of Kitkun Bays air contingent, VC-5 had been distinguishing themselves in their fight against the Japanese fleet. At 8:44, Richard L. Fowler, VC-5's commander, led a group of eight FM-2 Wildcats and sixteen TBM Avengers, and under his command, at 8:53, an Avenger from Manila Bay succeeded in landing a torpedo hit on Chikuma, disabling her handling, and bringing her out of the battle.

After Gambier Bay had been thoroughly damaged by shells, setting the ship ablaze, the Japanese turned their attention towards Kitkun Bay, as she peeked out of the smoke. The Japanese gunnery gradually adjusted their aim, and starting from their first salvo at 8:28, crept up to within . Despite the desperate use of smoke screens, and the heroic defense of her escorts, by 8:55, the Japanese had already closed the distance to only . At 8:59, the cruiser , which already had her stern blown off by a torpedo from the destroyer escort , suffered a secondary explosion, possibly derived from the cooking off of munitions onboard, crippling her handling and forcing her out of the vanguard formation. At 9:05, Fowler guided two Avengers towards Chōkai, where they released their payloads, with Fowler reporting nine  bomb hits, five amidships, three near the bow, and one near the stern, fatally damaging the heavy cruiser. At 9:40, Chōkai was scuttled by torpedoes from the destroyer . Undaunted, Tone had closed the distance to within  of Kitkun Bay, with its salvo straddling the fleeing carrier on both sides. As a parting shot, a volley passed Kitkun Bays side by only . However, at this point, Admiral Kurita, discouraged by the resistance he was facing, and uncertain about the intelligence provided to him, convinced himself to withdraw. At 9:25, to the bewilderment of Rear Admiral Sprague, the Japanese fleet turned around and retired. Remarkably, Kitkun Bay, despite several near-misses, suffered no significant damage during the engagement, and only a few casualties from flying fragments.

"Taffy 3" continued harassing the Japanese as they withdrew from the Battle off Samar. At 10:15, six TBM-1C Avengers were launched from Kitkun Bay, five of them outfitted with torpedoes, joining four more TBM Avengers to attack the retreating Japanese fleet. Proceeding north, one of the TBM Avengers was forced to break off due to mechanical issues. The remaining strike force sighted Chikuma, and in the ensuing action, scored two torpedo hits on the Chikumas portside, severely damaging it.

At 10:51, five kamikaze Zeroes were spotted approaching "Taffy 3" from the northwest. These planes were part of Yukio Seki's "Shikishima" squadron, which were conducting the first official kamikaze attacks of the war. The carriers and their escorts were caught out of position, and by the time concentrated anti-aircraft fire could be brought to bear, the kamikazes were nearly on-top of the formation. The first kamikaze to strike set its sights on Kitkun Bay, diving from her port side. As it approached the carrier, the kamikaze changed the angle of its dive, aiming directly for Kitkun Bays island, but at the last second, perhaps due to the incapacitation of the pilot, it streaked just over the island. The bomb showered fragments throughout the flight deck, puncturing more than 100 holes, and breached the gasoline lines, forming a puddle within a gun sponson, which was washed overboard. One crewman onboard was killed, four were seriously wounded, twelve were slightly wounded, and two TBM-1C Avengers were rendered inoperational from the attack. This gave Kitkun Bay the uneasy distinction of being the first ship to undergo kamikaze attack in the course of the Pacific War. Many of her fellow ships would follow, including her sisters in "Taffy 3", who were not so lucky, with Kalinin Bay being badly injured and St. Lo suffering fatal damage.

At 11:10, a group of fifteen Yokosuka D4Ys was detected approaching by Kitkun Bay. On 26 October, "Taffy 3" was instructed to retire to Manus for replenishment and repairs, arriving there on 1 November. There, Captain Albert Handly took over command of the vessel. Transiting eastwards, VC-5's planes were detached to Ford Island on the morning of 18 November, and the squadron's pilots were unloaded at Pearl Harbor later that day. She was put into dry dock for repairs, being discharged on 29 November, when she took on Composite Squadron (VC) 91 as her air squadron. Entering Manus on 17 December, Ofstie put on Kitkun Bay again as his flagship. At Manus, preparations were made for the planned landings on Luzon. Kitkun Bay was assigned as the flagship of Task Unit 77.4.3, the Lingayen Protective Group, along with her sister .

Invasion of Lingayen Gulf

On 31 December, the American fleet set out from Seeadler Harbor. En route, until 8 January 1945, when the American fleet arrived within Lingayen Gulf, the task unit's aircraft contingent provided an air screen for the Task Force 79, under the command of Vice Admiral Theodore Stark Wilkinson, which included landing craft, as it transited towards the invasion site.

The fighters of Kitkun Bay and Shamrock Bay, which had been conducting air patrols at the time, were diverted to intercept the planes. However, two of the kamikazes evaded the screen, and at 18:55, soon after the sun had set, one of the kamikazes started its dive upon Kitkun Bay. Fortunately for Kitkun Bay, the kamikaze's bombs proved to be duds, although the explosion of its fuel tank killed four men and ignited a fire. In addition, leading up to impact, a 5-inch round fired from one of her fellow ships burst near her bow under a gun sponson, killing and wounding several, with the blast sending a crewman into the water, where he had to be rescued. Altogether, the attack killed sixteen and wounded thirty-seven.

Kitkun Bay quickly acquired a list of 13° to port, and she was down  by her stern. Furthermore, water enveloped the engineering compartments, forcing the crew inside to evacuate, and smoke filtered throughout the belowdecks. Spurred by this serious situation, the entirety of the crew was ordered onto the flight deck, where the aircraft at hand were repositioned towards the starboard side in an attempt to correct the list. All non-essential crew were transferred off the ship onto her screens, and Rear Admiral Ofstie ordered all confidential documents onboard to be destroyed, before transferring himself and his complement to the destroyer , which ferried him to Shamrock Bay.

Pumping checked her list down to 4°, and repair parties entering the engine room were able to restore partial power. At 20:42, Chowanac secured a line to her, where they proceeded towards Santiago island. On the morning of 9 January, she was able to make steam under her own power, and all personnel sans the wounded returned later that day. Limited flight operations were even resumed, although she was ordered to retire on 11 January as part of a convoy. Making stops for limited repairs at Leyte Gulf, where she transferred her aircraft off, Manus, and Pearl Harbor, she returned to the United States by late February.

Moored at Terminal Island for repairs and refitting, Kitkun Bay would not set sail again until 27 April, when she underwent a transport mission to Pearl Harbor, where it was discovered that additional repairs were required. After conducting some exercises with her new aircraft contingent, Composite Squadron (VC) 63, she departed on the morning of 15 June for Ulithi, stopping at Guam. There, she reported to Task Force 30.8, the Third Fleet, forming Task Unit 30.8.23 along with her sister . The two carriers provided screening and antisubmarine patrols for the fast carriers, which launched strikes all along the Japanese islands, and conducted replenishment missions in support of the rest of the fleet. Notably, at this point, the Japanese were conserving their forces for the expected invasion of Japan, and Kitkun Bay encountered little serious opposition in her patrols. Nonetheless, Kitkun Bay suffered men lost during this period. On 4 August, a forge within the shipfitter's shop exploded, burning several men, killing one, and forcing two others overboard to escape the flames, who were later rescued by the destroyer escort . On 11 August, Captain John Francis Greenslade took over command of the ship at Eniwetok. At Eniwetok, on 15 August, the crew of Kitkun Bay received word of the Japanese surrender.

Post-war
Kitkun Bay formed Task Unit 49.5.2, turning out on 16 August for Adak Island. There, she joined a bevy of other warships headed towards Mutsu Bay, where Vice Admiral Frank Jack Fletcher accepted the surrender for Japanese forces in northern Honshu and in Hokkaido. Then, she steamed southwards into Tokyo Bay. There, she joined the Operation Magic Carpet fleet, which repatriated U.S. servicemen from around the Pacific. In her maiden Magic Carpet voyage, she picked up 554 servicemen in Japan, including ex-POWs, and ferried them to San Francisco. She conducted additional trips to Pearl Harbor and Okinawa, entering San Pedro on 12 January 1946. She then proceeded up the West Coast, entering Puget Sound on 18 February.

There, Kitkun Bay was decommissioned on 19 April, and struck from the Navy list on 8 May. She was sold on 18 November to Zidell Ship Dismantling Company of Portland for $12,700. She was transferred in January 1947, and scrapped sometime in early 1947. Kitkun Bay received six battle stars for World War II service, and along with the rest of Taffy 3, received the Presidential Unit Citation for conduct during the Battle off Samar.

References

Sources

Online sources

Bibliography

External links 

 

 

Casablanca-class escort carriers
World War II escort aircraft carriers of the United States
Ships built in Vancouver, Washington
1943 ships
S4-S2-BB3 ships